Gribskov Kommune is a municipality (Danish, kommune) in Region Hovedstaden ("Capital Region"). The municipality covers an area of 278 km², and has a total population of 41,147 (1. January 2022).

The municipality was created on 1 January 2007 as a merger of the former municipalities of Græsted-Gilleleje and Helsinge. Its mayor as of 1 January 2018 is Anders Gerner Frost, a member of the local  Nytgribskov (New Gribskov) political party.

Locations

Politics

Municipal council
Gribskov's municipal council consists of 23 members, elected every four years.

Below are the municipal councils elected since the Municipal Reform of 2007.

Attractions

There is a large concentration of dolmens and tumuli within the municipality.

Of special mention is 'Valby Hegn', a small plantation close to Helsinge and Gribskov and home to no less than seven long barrows from the neolithic Stone Age.

Other interesting sites includes:
 Rudolph Tegner Museum
 Munkeruphus
 Asserbo Charterhouse
 Søborg Castle
 Esrum Abbey
 Tisvilde Hegn
 Gribskov

Sources and references 
 Municipal statistics: NetBorger Kommunefakta, delivered from KMD aka Kommunedata (Municipal Data)
 Municipal mergers and neighbors: Eniro new municipalities map

External links 

Official website
Netavisen Gribskov, municipal newspaper
Website 

Municipalities in the Capital Region of Denmark
Municipalities of Denmark
Populated places established in 2007